The 2004 PharmAssist Players' Championship was held March 31 – April 4 at the Mile One Stadium in St. John's, Newfoundland and Labrador.

The total purse for the event was $150,000 with $43,000 going to the winning team, which would be John Morris' Calgary rink. He defeated his cross-provincial counterparts from Edmonton, the Kevin Martin rink, whose team earned $24,000.

Draw

Pool A

Pool B

Pool C

Tie breakers
 Guy Hemmings 5-0  Brad Gushue

Playoffs

External links
CurlingZone - 2004 Players' Championship

Players Championship, 2004
Sport in St. John's, Newfoundland and Labrador
Curling in Newfoundland and Labrador
Players' Championship